Transocean Tours was a German cruise line that operated ocean-going cruise ships in the German and British markets and river cruise ships in Germany. The company was formed in 1954 and first began operating cruises in 1972, using ships chartered from the Soviet Union-based Baltic Shipping Company.

The company, along with its United Kingdom based parent company Cruise & Maritime Voyages (CMV), went into administration on 20 July 2020.

History

Early years 
Transocean Tours Turistik was formed in West Germany in 1954. In 1972 Transocean Tours chartered the Estonia for full-time German market cruising. She was subsequently followed by several ships, including river cruise ships, chartered from both the Baltic Shipping Company and the Black Sea Shipping Company. Until the 1990s the chartered ships retained their Soviet funnel colours even when in Transocean service. Following the collapse of the Soviet Union the company begun chartering ships from other companies, starting with MS Calypso in 1994. At the same ships in Transocean service started to be painted in the company's white/blue livery.

1997-present 
Between 1997 and 2001, the company fleet consisted of just two ships, the ocean-going cruise ship  and the river cruise ship MS Moldavia. In 2001, the river cruise ship MS Ukraina re-joined the fleet, followed by the Astors near-sister  in 2002. Another river cruise ship joined the fleet in 2005, while  was chartened in 2006 for British-market cruising.

In 2008, Transocean Tours stated the charter of the Astoria would be terminated in 2009, and that the company are looking for another ship to replace her. She was sold to Saga Cruises operating as Saga Pearl II with a short period as Quest for Adventure in 2012/13.

On 4 September 2010, Transocean Tours announced that the Germany-based line would be going through a restructuring, which was the equivalent to Chapter 11 bankruptcy restructuring in the United States. After a period of uncertainty Transocean was sold to South Quay Travel & Leisure Ltd. in early 2014 and since then  operated as the German branch of Cruise & Maritime Voyages (CMV).

In addition to their own Astor; Transocean Tours offered cruises on CMV's cruise ships Magellan and Columbus and on several river cruise ships (Bellejour, Belvedere, Sans Souci).

It was announced on 7 March 2018 that CMV purchased the Pacific Eden from P&O Cruises Australia. CMV planned to sail the ship under the Transocean brand, cruising to Northern and Western Europe during the summer and Australia during the winter, replacing Astor. CMV received Pacific Eden in April 2019 and renamed her Vasco da Gama on 9 June 2019.

Transocean was scheduled to receive Pacific Aria from P&O Cruises Australia in May 2021.  The company intended to rename the ship Ida Pfeiffer, after the Austrian explorer, Ida Pfeiffer, in May 2021.

Sky News reported on 15 July 2020 that CMV was facing insolvency and was in talks with VGO Capital Management, which Sky described as "a special situations investor with expertise in the shipping industry," for additional financing. CMV had previously sought a financing agreement with private equity firm Novalpina Capital; this attempt failed after Barclays declined to offer the company a state-backed loan.

After its parent company's attempts to secure financing failed, Transocean Tours, as well as CMV, entered administration on 20 July 2020, with all trading ceased and all sales offices closed with immediate effect.

Fleet

References

External links

 Official website

Companies based in Bremen
Defunct cruise lines
Shipping companies of Germany
Travel and holiday companies of Germany
River cruise companies
German companies established in 1954
German companies disestablished in 2020
Transport companies established in 1954
Transport companies disestablished in 2020